Hrastov Dol is a small village in the hills southeast of Ivančna Gorica in central Slovenia. The area is part of the historical region of Lower Carniola. The Municipality of Ivančna Gorica is now included in the Central Slovenia Statistical Region. 

The parish church in the settlement is dedicated to Saint Andrew and belongs to the Parish of Šentvid pri Stični. It dates to the first half of the 16th century.

References

External links

Hrastov Dol on Geopedia

Populated places in the Municipality of Ivančna Gorica